Labial vein may refer to:

 Inferior labial vein
 Posterior labial veins
 Superior labial vein